The Mykolas Žilinskas Art Gallery is an art museum based in Kaunas, Lithuania, which is a branch of the M. K. Čiurlionis National Art Museum. The majority of exhibited works were donated by the famous Lithuanian collector Mykolas Žilinskas. In 1991, the sculpture "Man", created by Petras Mazūras in 1986, was erected next to the entrance. In 2020, the post-modernist building of the gallery was included in the Register of Cultural Treasures.

Image gallery

References

Art museums and galleries in Lithuania
1989 establishments in Lithuania
Art museums established in 1989
Museums in Kaunas